Donghee Industrial Co. Ltd. is a South Korean group of companies producing various automotive parts such as chassis, fuel tanks, pedal parts, sunroofs, axle housings and body panels. Donghee Auto Co. Ltd., one of its subsidiaries, co-manufactures the Kia Picanto in a joint venture plant with Kia Motors.

History
Donghee was established in 1972 as Dongseung Co. Ltd. to produce automotive bumper and pedal parts. In 1986, Donghee Industrial Co. Ltd. was established in Ulsan with the assistance of Hyundai Motor Company. A year later, Donghee formed a joint venture with German firm Webasto to locally manufacture sunroof parts as Webasto Donghee (formerly Korea Sunroof Co. Ltd.). Donghee Auto Co. Ltd. was established in 2002 as a joint venture with Kia Motors to manufacture the Kia Picanto in Seosan.

Outside Korea, Donghee has manufacturing plants in China, Czech Republic, Slovakia, Turkey, Russia, and The United States.

References

External links
South Korea

Auto parts suppliers of South Korea
Automotive companies established in 1972
Manufacturing companies based in Seoul
Multinational companies headquartered in South Korea
South Korean companies established in 1972